Eupithecia panda is a moth in the family Geometridae first described by Herbert Druce in 1893. It is found in Costa Rica and Peru.

References

Moths described in 1893
panda
Moths of Central America
Moths of South America